Mesothen aurantegula is a moth of the subfamily Arctiinae. It was described by E. Dukinfield Jones in 1914. It is found in Brazil.

References

 

Mesothen (moth)
Moths described in 1914